Jean-François Marceau (born September 26, 1976) is a male judoka from Canada, who won the gold medal at the 2004 US Judo Open in the men's 81 kg division. He beat Shintaro Kakuchi of Japan in the final.

He is the executive director of Judo Québec.

Among his titles:

- 5 times Canadian senior champion

- 2 times Canadian juvenile champion

- 1 time  Canadian junior champion

- 2004 U.S. Open champion - 81 kg. gold

- 2003 Pan American Games - 73 kg- bronze

- 2002 Commonwealth Games - 73 kg- bronze

He has also won medals at other competitions including Rendez-vous Canada, Les Jeux de la Francophonie and the Swedish Open.

References
 
 Club Judo Anjou

See also
 Judo in Canada

1976 births
Living people
Canadian male judoka
Judoka at the 2003 Pan American Games
Pan American Games bronze medalists for Canada
Commonwealth Games medallists in judo
Commonwealth Games bronze medallists for Canada
Pan American Games medalists in judo
Judoka at the 2002 Commonwealth Games
Medalists at the 2003 Pan American Games
20th-century Canadian people
21st-century Canadian people
Medallists at the 2002 Commonwealth Games